Hello, Love is a 1959 studio album by the American jazz singer Ella Fitzgerald, recorded over two sessions in 1957 and 1959.

The album focuses on well known songs not included in Fitzgerald's epic Songbooks project, and several of the songs are tunes that she had recently recorded in duet with Louis Armstrong.

Track listing
For the 1959 Verve LP release; Verve VS-4034; Re-issued in 2004 on CD, Verve 0602498625811

Side One:
 "You Go to My Head" (John Frederick Coots, Haven Gillespie) – 4:38
 "Willow Weep for Me" (Ann Ronell) – 4:03
 "I'm Thru with Love" (Gus Kahn, Fud Livingston, Matty Malneck) – 3:48
 "Spring Will Be a Little Late This Year" (Frank Loesser) – 3:20
 "Everything Happens to Me" (Tom Adair, Matt Dennis) – 3:55
 "Lost in a Fog" (Dorothy Fields, Jimmy McHugh) – 4:04
Side Two:
 "I've Grown Accustomed to His Face" (Alan Jay Lerner, Frederick Loewe) – 3:07
 "I'll Never Be the Same" (Kahn, Malneck, Frank Signorelli) – 4:27
 "So Rare" (Jerry Herst, Jack Sharpe) – 3:37
 "Tenderly" (Walter Gross, Jack Lawrence) – 3:12
 "Stairway to the Stars" (Malneck, Mitchell Parish, Signorelli) – 2:54
 "Moonlight in Vermont" (John Blackburn, Karl Suessdorf) – 3:20

Personnel 
 Ella Fitzgerald - Vocals
 Frank DeVol - Arranger, Conductor
 Milt Bernhart - Trombone
 George Roberts
 Lloyd Ulyate
 Pete Candoli - Trumpet
 Harry "Sweets" Edison
 Ray Linn
 George Werth
 Clint Neagley - Alto Saxophone
 Ben Webster - Tenor Saxophone
 Bert Gassman - Oboe
 Arnold Koblentz
 Gordon Schoneberg
 Skeets Herfurt - Woodwind
 Joseph J. Koch
 Ernest Romersa
 Norm Herzberg - Bassoon
 Kenneth Lowman
 Jack Marsh
 Martin Ruderman - Flute
 Sylvia Ruderman
 Milt Holland - percussion
 Barney Kessel - Guitar
 Abe Luboff - Double Bass
 Joe Mondragon
 Philip Stephens
 Alvin Stoller - drums
 Arnold Ross - Piano
 Dorothy Remsen - Harp

References

1950 albums
Ella Fitzgerald albums
Verve Records albums
Albums produced by Norman Granz
Albums arranged by Frank De Vol
Albums conducted by Frank De Vol